Andrej Sallitinger was a politician of the late 16th century and early 17th century in Slovenia when the country was under the Holy Roman Empire. He became mayor of Ljubljana in 1601.
He was succeeded by Mihael Preiss in 1605.

References

Mayors of places in the Holy Roman Empire
Mayors of Ljubljana
Year of birth missing
Year of death missing
16th-century Carniolan people
17th-century Carniolan people